Taracena is a village (pedanía) belonging to the municipality of Guadalajara, Spain. It lies near the A-2.

History 
The area of Taracena has been often identified (including by Adolf Schulten) as the location of Caraca, the city besieged and subjugated by Quintus Sertorius in the 1st century BCE.

A former municipality, Taracena was absorbed by the provincial capital in 1969, together with Valdenoches and Iriépal.

References 
Citations

Bibliography
 
 
 

Guadalajara, Spain
Populated places in the Province of Guadalajara